Hippopotamus antiquus is an extinct species of Hippopotamus that ranged across Europe during the Early and Middle Pleistocene.

Chronology 
H. antiquus is suggested to be closely related to the African species Hippopotamus gorgops, and may be a descendant of that species. The oldest records of the species date to the Early Pleistocene. Remains probably originating from the Upper Vardano Basin in Italy are suggested to date between 1.9 to 1.7 million years ago. H. antiquus first became widespread north of the Alps around 1.1 to 1 million years ago. The youngest remains of the species are from Condeixa in Portugal, suggested to date to approximately 400,000 years ago. Later records of Hippopotamus in Europe are believed to belong to the modern hippopotamus (Hippopotamus amphibius).

Distribution 

H. antiquus ranged from the Iberian Peninsula to the British Isles to the Rhine River to Greece. Remains possibly attributable to the species are also known from the Ubeidiya site in Israel. Their distribution was strongly controlled by temperature, with the species only extending to the northern parts of Europe during warmer interglacial intervals.

Descripton 
At an average weight of 3200 kg (7040 lb), Hippopotamus antiquus was larger than the modern common hippopotamus (Hippopotamus amphibius), but smaller than Hippopotamus gorgops. In comparison to modern Hippopotamus amphibius, the skull is more slender and elongate, but with a shorter neurocranium. Hippopotamus antiquus has been suggested to have been more aquatically adapted than Hippopotamus amphibius, with the skull having more elevated eyesockets and the feet having shorter metapodial bones than H. amphibius. An analysis of nitrogen isotopes suggests that H. antiquus preferred aquatic plants, in contrast to modern H. amphibius, which prefers terrestrial grasses.

The Cretan dwarf hippopotamus (H. creutzburgi) is believed to have evolved from H. antiquus through the process of insular dwarfism on the island of Crete.

References

Extinct hippopotamuses
Pleistocene even-toed ungulates
Prehistoric mammals of Europe
Fossil taxa described in 1822